A centimetre or millimetre of water (US spelling centimeter or millimeter of water) are less commonly used measures of pressure based on the pressure head of water.

Centimetre of water

A centimetre of water (US spelling centimeter of water) is a unit of pressure.

The centimetre of water unit is frequently used to measure the central venous pressure, the intracranial pressure while sampling cerebrospinal fluid, as well as determining pressures during mechanical ventilation or in water supply networks (then usually in metres water column).  It is also a common unit of pressure in the speech sciences. This unit is commonly used to specify the pressure to which a CPAP machine is set after a polysomnogram.

{|
|-
|  || = 98.0665 pascals
|-
|rowspan=9|
|= 0.01 metre water (mH2O), metre water column (m wc) or metre water gauge (m wg)
|-
|= 10 mm wg
|-
|=  mbar or hPa
|-
|≈  inH2O
|-
|≈  atm
|-
|≈  torr
|-
|≈  mm Hg
|-
|≈  inHg
|-
|≈  psi
|}

Millimetre of water

Millimetre of water (US spelling millimeter of water) is a unit of pressure.
{|
|-
|  || = 9.80665 pascals
|-
|rowspan=9|
|= 0.001 metre water (mH2O), metre water column (m.wc) or metre water gauge (m wg)
|-
|= 0.1 cm wg
|-
|=  mbar or hPa
|-
|≈  inH2O
|-
|≈ 
|-
|≈  torr
|-
|≈  mmHg
|-
|≈  inHg
|-
|≈  psi
|}

In limited and largely historic contexts it may vary with temperature, using the equation:
 P = ρ·g·h/1000,
 where
 P: pressure in Pa
 ρ: density of water (conventionally 1000 kg/m3 at 4 °C)
 g: acceleration due to gravity (conventionally 9.80665 m/s2 but sometimes locally determined)
 h: water height in millimetres.

The unit is often used to describe how much water rainwear or other outerwear can take or how much water a tent can resist without leaking.

See also
 Millimetre of mercury

References

External links
 Pressure conversion calculator at Cornell University website

Units of pressure